Anthony Toney (born September 23, 1962) is a former professional American football running back for five seasons in the National Football League (NFL) for the Philadelphia Eagles. He played college football at Texas A&M University and was drafted in the second round of the 1986 NFL Draft by the Eagles.

References

1962 births
American football fullbacks
Living people
Sportspeople from Salinas, California
Philadelphia Eagles players
Texas A&M Aggies football players